{{DISPLAYTITLE:C23H32N6O4S}}
The molecular formula C23H32N6O4S (molar mass: 488.60 g/mol, exact mass: 488.2206 u) may refer to:

 Aildenafil
 Homosildenafil
 Vardenafil

Molecular formulas